Elnaz Ghasemi (born 13 January 1996) is an Iranian handball player for Antalya Anadolu SK and the Iranian national team.

References

1996 births
Living people
People from Qom
Expatriate handball players
Iranian expatriate sportspeople in Turkey
Iranian female handball players
21st-century Iranian women